Oak Ridge Historic District (also known as Clinton Engineer Works Townsite) is a historic district in Oak Ridge, Tennessee, that is listed on the National Register of Historic Places.

Roughly bounded by East Drive, Outer and West Outer Drives, Louisiana Avenue, and Tennessee Avenue, the district comprises much of Oak Ridge's original Manhattan Project townsite, laid out by Skidmore, Owings and Merrill.

Contributing properties in the historic district include United Church, The Chapel on the Hill, the Alexander Inn, and Highland View Elementary School, which houses the Children's Museum of Oak Ridge. The district was added to the National Register in 1991.

References

Historic districts on the National Register of Historic Places in Tennessee
Geography of Anderson County, Tennessee
Oak Ridge, Tennessee
Energy infrastructure on the National Register of Historic Places
National Register of Historic Places in Anderson County, Tennessee